Sergei Yurievich Yursky (16 March 1935 – 8 February 2019) was a Soviet and Russian stage and film actor, theatre director and screenwriter. His best known film role is Ostap Bender in The Golden Calf (1968)

Biography 
Yursky was born in Leningrad, USSR, on 16 March 1935 in the family of Yuri Sergeyevich Yursky. He studied at the Faculty of Law of Zhdanov Leningrad State University.

In 1959 he graduated from Ostrovsky Leningrad Theatrical Institute, Leonid Makaryev's course.

From 1957 till 1979 he was one of the leading actors of Gorky Bolshoi Drama Theater in Leningrad. The leading part in Wit Works Woe (1962) by Alexander Griboedov made him one of the most significant actors of his generation. His director's debut Moliere (also known as The Cabal of Hypocrites) by Mikhail Bulgakov in 1977 was highly acclaimed, but was not accepted by Georgy Tovstonogov, and led to Yursky's departure from the theatre.

From 1979, he was an actor and director of Mossovet Theater in Moscow. Also worked as an actor and director in Moscow Art Theatre, as well as in Belgium, France and Japan. 

Yursky performed one-man recitals of poetry and prose, touring widely with them in USSR, then Russia and beginning in the 1990s many countries with Russian-speaking population.

Partial filmography 

1961: The Man from Nowhere as Chudak
1963: The Serf Actress as Prince Nikita Petrovich Baturin
1965: Time, Forward! as  Margulies
1966: The Republic of ShKID as Vicknicksor
1968: The Little Golden Calf as Ostap Bender
1969: Intervention as Masks
1969: King Stag as Tartaglia
1976: The Darvish Detonates Paris as Musje Jordan
1979: The Meeting Place Cannot Be Changed (TV Mini-Series) as Gruzdev
1979: Little Tragedies (TV Mini-Series) as Improviser
1983: Look for a Woman (TV Movie) as notary Rochet
1984: Love and Pigeons as Uncle Mitya
1987: The End of Eternity as Computer Hobbe Finge
2006: Master and  Margarita  as Berlioz (voice, uncredited)
2007: Korolyov as Konstantin Tsiolkovsky

Awards
1968: Honoured Artist of the RSFSR
1987: People's Artist of the RSFSR
1991: Kinotavr Grand Prize in feature films
2000: Pushkin Medal
2005: Order "For Merit to the Fatherland" of IV degree
2010: Order "For Merit to the Fatherland" of III degree

References

External links 

 

1935 births
2019 deaths
Soviet male actors
Russian male actors
Male actors from Saint Petersburg
Academicians of the Russian Academy of Cinema Arts and Sciences "Nika"
Academic staff of High Courses for Scriptwriters and Film Directors
Recipients of the Order "For Merit to the Fatherland", 3rd class
Recipients of the Order "For Merit to the Fatherland", 4th class
Recipients of the Order of Honour (Russia)
Recipients of the Medal of Pushkin
People's Artists of the RSFSR
Honored Artists of the RSFSR
Jewish Russian actors
Russian State Institute of Performing Arts alumni
Soviet theatre directors
Burials in Troyekurovskoye Cemetery
Audiobook narrators
Theatre directors from Moscow